Brucella pseudogrignonensis is a gram-negative, oxidase-positive, non-spore-forming, non-motile bacteria from the genus of Brucella which was isolated from blood of a man in Göteborg in Sweden.

References

External links
Type strain of Ochrobactrum pseudogrignonense at BacDive -  the Bacterial Diversity Metadatabase

Hyphomicrobiales
Bacteria described in 2007